The Public Rangelands Improvement Act of 1978 (PRIA) defines the current grazing fee formula and establishes rangeland monitoring and inventory procedures for Bureau of Land Management and United States Forest Service rangelands. The National Grasslands are exempt from PRIA.

The H.R. 10587 legislation was passed by the 95th U.S. Congressional session and enacted into law by the 39th President of the United States Jimmy Carter on October 25, 1978.

References

External links

1978 in law
95th United States Congress
United States Department of Agriculture